María Mendoza de Baratta (February 27, 1890 – June 10, 1978) was a Salvadoran composer, pianist, musicologist, and folklorist.

Biography
Born in San Salvador, Baratta was the daughter of José Ángel Mendoza and María García de Mendoza, the latter a well-regarded pianist. Her mother was her first teacher, and she took lessons in solfege with Agustín Solórzano. She then began lessons at the National Conservatory with Maria Zimmerman and Antonio Gianoli. Other teachers included Juan Aberle, Vicente de Arrillaga, Alfredo Villalba and Antonio Yianilli. Between 1926 and 1938 Baratta engaged in an active performing career; she also represented the country at various folkloric congresses. During her career she was a member of the Athenaeum of El Salvador, the Salvadoran Academy of History, and the Union of American Women. In 1962 she was elected a Woman of the Americas. She composed a handful of works during her career, only a few of which were published; they include the ballet El Teocalli, Canto al Sol, Ofrenda de la Elegida, Los Tecomatillos, Nahualismo, Procesión Hierática, Danza del Incienso, and El Cancionero de la jarra verde. Baratta died in the city of her birth.

References

1890 births
1978 deaths
Salvadoran composers
Salvadoran pianists
Salvadoran musicologists
Salvadoran folklorists
Women musicologists
Women folklorists
20th-century composers
20th-century pianists
20th-century musicologists
People from San Salvador
20th-century women composers
20th-century women pianists